Harry Northrup (born Henri Stabo Wallace Northrup; 31 July 1875 – 2 July 1936), was an American film actor of the silent era. He appeared in more than 130 films between 1911 and 1935. He was born in Paris and died in Los Angeles, California.

Selected filmography

 The Christian (1914)
 Hearts and the Highway (1915)
 My Lady's Slipper (1916)
 Fifty-Fifty (1916)
 The Blue Envelope Mystery (1916)
 The Traveling Salesman (1916)
 The Millionaire's Double (1917)
 The Greatest Power (1917)
 Their Compact (1917)
 The Trail of the Shadow (1917)
 The Beautiful Lie (1917)
 The Voice of Conscience (1917)
 The Eyes of Mystery (1918)
 The Trail to Yesterday (1918)
 Arizona (1918)
 In Judgement Of (1918)
 The Fear Woman (1919)
 As the Sun Went Down (1919)
 The Way of the Strong (1919)
 The Prince of Avenue A (1920)
 The Luck of the Irish (1920)
 Polly of the Storm Country (1920)
 The Blue Moon (1920)
 The White Circle (1920)
 Wing Toy (1921)
 The Four Horsemen of the Apocalypse (1921)
 Sowing the Wind (1921)
 Flower of the North (1921)
 Jazzmania (1923)
 The Greatest Menace (1923)
 Human Wreckage (1923)
 A Fool's Awakening (1924)
 The Gambling Fool (1925)
 The Unchastened Woman (1925)
 He Who Laughs Last (1925)
 Racing Romance (1926)
 The Heart of Maryland (1927)
 The Shield of Honor (1928)
 Burning Daylight (1928)
 The Divine Sinner (1928)
 The Cheer Leader (1928)
 The Last Warning (1929)
 Men Call It Love (1931)
 The Squaw Man (1931)

References

External links

 

1875 births
1936 deaths
American male film actors
American male silent film actors
French emigrants to the United States
20th-century American male actors